Cool Like You is the second studio album by English indie pop band Blossoms. It was released in the United Kingdom on 27 April 2018, by Virgin EMI Records. The album was produced by James Skelly and Rich Turvey. It peaked at number 4 on the UK Albums Chart, and at number 1 on the Official Vinyl Albums Chart and it received a silver certification in the United Kingdom in 2019 and a gold certification in 2022.

Track listing
All tracks are written by Tom Ogden, Josh Dewhurst, Charlie Salt, Joe Donovan & Myles Kellock

Personnel
Credits adapted from Cool Like You liner notes.

Blossoms
Tom Ogden - vocals, rhythm guitar, keyboards, percussion (track 8)
Charlie Salt - bass guitar, backing vocals, percussion (track 8), keyboards (track 11)
Josh Dewhurst - lead guitar, percussion (track 8)
Joe Donovan - drums
Myles Kellock - keyboards, talkbox (track 3)

Additional musicians
James Skelly - backing vocals (tracks 1, 6, 8 and 10), percussion (track 8)
Rich Turvey - keyboards (tracks 1, 4, 6, 8 and 11), guitars (track 10)

Design
Salvador Design - album design
Danny North - photography
Charlie Salt - additional photography

Production
James Skelly - production
Rich Turvey - production
David Wrench - additional production (tracks 1, 2, 5 and 7), mixing
Matt Colton - mastering
Cecile Desnos - engineering
Grace Banks - engineering
Charlotte Sutcliffe - engineering assistant
Daniel Hancox - engineering assistant
Elliott Parkin - engineering assistant
Jay Leahey - engineering assistant

Charts

Certifications

References

2018 albums
Blossoms (band) albums